William Blaney Richardson (19 March 1868, in Boston, Massachusetts – 1 December 1927, in Matagalpa, Nicaragua) was an American-Nicaraguan naturalist and professional collector of zoological specimens.

As a young man, Richardson was employed by Charles B. Cory to collect bird specimens in the West Indies.

While collecting specimens in Mexico, Richardson married the Mexican citizen Rosaura Ojeda. When he and his wife moved to Nicaragua, he changed his middle name from "Blaney" to "Blaine".

In southwestern Colombia from November 1910 to July 1911 and from August 1912 to October 1912, Richardson collected many mammalian specimens.

One of his daughters married Francisco Navarro, Vice President of Nicaragua from 1937 to 1939, and one of his grandsons, Bill Richardson, was Governor of New Mexico from 2003 to 2011.

Richardson is commemorated in the scientific names of the rodents Microhydromys richardsoni (northern groove-toothed shrew mouse or Richardson's shrew mouse) and
Rattus richardsoni (glacier rat or Richardson's mountain rat)

References

American naturalists
1868 births
1927 deaths
20th-century naturalists